Nurobod may refer to:

 Nurobod, Uzbekistan, a city in Samarqand Region
 Nurobod, Tashkent Region, a town in Tashkent Region
 Nurobod District, Uzbekistan
 Nurobod District, Tajikistan

See also
 Nurabad (disambiguation)